Scopula vojnitsi is a moth of the family Geometridae. It is found in the Russian Far East.

References

Moths described in 1992
vojnitsi
Moths of Asia